Ilex cristata is a species of plant in the family Aquifoliaceae. It is endemic to New Guinea, occurring to 2680 metres above sea level.

References

cristata